Plaka Bridge (Gefýri tis Plákas) is a 19th-century stone one-arch bridge in Greece that collapsed during the floods of 1 February 2015, and rebuilt in 2020.

It is located at the borders of Arta and Ioannina prefectures, above the waters of Arachthos River. Administratively, it belongs to the community of Plaka-Raftaneon. With its arch of  width and  height, it was the largest one-arch bridge in Greece and the Balkans, and the third largest one-arch stone bridge in Europe. It also had two small auxiliary arches of  width on its two sides. It was considered "one of the most difficult, single-arch bridges to construct."

The bridge was the starting point for rafting and canoeing on Arachthos River.

History

Construction
The bridge was built upon the order of Ottoman Sultan Abdülaziz, and was completed in 1866 under the supervision of the famous local builder Kostas Bekas from the nearby village Pramanta. Two previous attempts by other builders in 1860 and 1863 had proven unsuccessful, with the bridge collapsing during construction (in 1863 it collapsed on the very day of its inauguration). The cost of construction, 180,000 kuruş, was covered by the local communities and the rich merchant Ioannis Loulis.

In operation

On 3 February 1878, during the anti-Ottoman revolt of that year, Greek troops under the command of Konstantinos Kottikas defeated the Turkish garrison of the bridge and made them retreat.

Between 1881 and 1912 (the First Balkan War), the bridge marked the border between the Kingdom of Greece and the Ottoman Empire, and a customs building was erected alongside it, which still survives. Also, near the bridge there was an outpost of the Greek army and an inn. The bridge used to be a trade route, connecting Tzoumerka with Epirus and Thessaly.

During World War II, it was bombed by the Germans, and it withstood the bombing with minor damage. Locals repaired it using cement in 1943. According to the treaty resistance groups agreed to refrain from infringing on each other's territory, and all future war efforts would be directed against the Germans. This marked the end of the "first round" of the Greek civil war, which had started on October 12, 1943.

In spite of the two small -wide relief arches, the bridge's apex thickness of  has been considered small by experts, causing a concentration of horizontal stresses in a region where a  crack could be found.

During heavy rains in 2007, the bridge nearly collapsed, and a restoration was considered but not taken, raising criticism by the public.

Collapse (2015)
The bridge, which was one of the most impressive examples of Greek popular architecture, collapsed on 1 February 2015. A flash flood caused by heavy rainfall caused the Arachthos River to rip the bridge's foundations from the riverbanks leading the central section of the bridge to collapse and be washed away. The next day, Alternate Minister of Infrastructure Christos Spirtzis and representatives of the Culture Ministry travelled to the region to assess the situation and announced that it was technically feasible to restore the historic bridge. Experts assessed the damage. The materials would be recovered from the river once water levels have fallen.

, restoration work, supported by the National Technical University of Athens is over, and the rebuilt bridge was completed in the summer of 2020.

References

External links

 
 
 Γεφύρι της Πλάκας (Plaka Bridge)
 Τι μάθαμε για τον Πρωτομάστορα Κώστα Μπέκα μέσα από την αναστήλωση του Γεφυριού της Πλάκας

Videos
, 2007
, 2012

Bridges completed in 1866
Ottoman bridges in Epirus (region)
Arch bridges in Greece
Stone bridges in Greece
Buildings and structures in Arta (regional unit)
Buildings and structures in Ioannina (regional unit)
Collapsed buildings and structures
1866 establishments in the Ottoman Empire
Footbridges
19th-century architecture in Greece